Middleton is an unincorporated community in San Juan County, Colorado, United States.  Its elevation is 9,793 feet (2,985 m).

References

Unincorporated communities in San Juan County, Colorado
Unincorporated communities in Colorado